Johannes Jönsson (born June 11, 1989) is a Swedish professional ice hockey goaltender. He is currently playing with AIK IF of the HockeyAllsvenskan (Allsv).

Jönsson made his European Elite debut playing with Örebro HK during the 2013 Kvalserien.

References

External links

1989 births
Living people
AIK IF players
Almtuna IS players
Karlskrona HK players
Kristianstads IK players
Swedish ice hockey goaltenders
Tingsryds AIF players
HC Vita Hästen players
Örebro HK players
People from Kalmar
Sportspeople from Kalmar County